
Histone acetyltransferase KAT2A is an enzyme that in humans is encoded by the KAT2A gene.

Interactions 

GCN5L2 has been shown to interact with:
 DDB1,
 Ku70, 
 Ku80,
 TADA2L, 
 TAF9,  and
 Transcription initiation protein SPT3 homolog.

References

Further reading

External links